Mount McCoy is a high table-topped massif with dark, snow-free, vertical walls, at the east side of Land Glacier in Marie Byrd Land, Antarctica. It was discovered by members of West Base of the United States Antarctic Service (1939–41) and named for James C. McCoy, chief pilot at West Base.

References

Mountains of Marie Byrd Land